Rodalquilarite is a rare iron tellurite chloride mineral with formula H3Fe3+2(Te4+O3)4Cl or Fe2(TeO2OH)3(TeO3)Cl. Rodalquilarite crystallizes in the triclinic system and typically occurs as stout green prisms and encrustations.

Discovery and occurrence

Rodalquilarite was first described in 1968 for an occurrence in the Rodalquilar gold deposit of Almeria, Spain and was named for the discovery locality. It has also been reported from the Wendy open pit mine, El Indio-Tambo district, Coquimbo Region of Chile and the mines of Tombstone, Arizona. It is found in the oxidized zone of tellurium-bearing gold deposits. It occurs associated with emmonsite, native gold, alunite, jarosite, quartz, native tellurium, mackayite and sonoraite.

References

Tellurite and selenite minerals
Triclinic minerals
Minerals in space group 2